Vittorio Giovanni Rossi (8 January 1898 – 4 January 1978) was an Italian journalist and writer.

Rossi was born in Santa Margherita Ligure, Italy. He died in Rome and is buried in the S. Margherita Ligure cemetery, where is also his dedicated museum, inside the beautiful Villa Durazzo.

He was special correspondent of the Italian newspaper Corriere della Sera and Epoca magazine. In his life he has been also shipmaster and officer, sailor and steersman, deep-sea diver and fisherman, caravaneer and miner.


Bibliography

Fiction

Le streghe di mare, Alpes 1930, reprint Il Castello 2003, 
Tassoni, Alpes 1931
Tropici, Bompiani 1934
Via degli spagnoli, Bompiani 1936
Oceano, Bompiani 1938, repr. De Ferrari & Devega 2001, 
Sabbia, Bompiani 1940
La guerra dei marinai, Bompiani 1941
Cobra, Bompiani 1941
Pelle d'uomo, Bompiani 1943
Alga, Bompiani 1945
Preludio alla notte, Bompiani 1948
Soviet, Garzanti 1952
Fauna, Bompiani 1953
Il granchio gioca col mare, Mondadori 1957
Cristina e lo Spirito Santo, Mondadori 1958
Festa delle lanterne, Mondadori 1960
La Terra è un'arancia dolce, Mondadori 1961
Nudi o vestiti, Mondadori 1963
Miserere coi fichi, Mondadori 1963
Il silenzio di Cassiopea, Mondadori 1965
Però il mare è ancora quello, Mondadori 1966
Teschio e tibie, Mondadori 1968
L'orso sogna le pere, Mondadori 1971
Calme di luglio, Mondadori 1973
Il cane abbaia alla luna, Mondadori 1975
Maestrale, Mondadori 1976
Terra e acqua, Mursia 1988,

Acknowledgments
Viareggio Prize, 1938, "Oceano"

Books on Vittorio G. Rossi
Vittorio G. Rossi, Alberto Frasson, Edizioni del Noce 1983,

External links

 Villa Durazzo, S. Margherita Ligure, Italy
 V.G. Rossi workplace in QTVR

1898 births
1978 deaths
People from Santa Margherita Ligure
20th-century Italian novelists
20th-century Italian male writers
Italian male journalists
Viareggio Prize winners
Italian male novelists
20th-century Italian journalists
Writers from Liguria